Ventrosa is a village in the province and autonomous community of La Rioja, Spain.

Politics

References

External links
 Webpage of the 7 Villas

Populated places in La Rioja (Spain)